In fluid dynamics, the Kirchhoff equations, named after Gustav Kirchhoff, describe the motion of a rigid body in an ideal fluid.

 

a unit normal to the surface of the body at the point ;
torque and force acting on the body, respectively;
 and  likewise denote all other torques and forces acting on the
body. The integration is performed over the fluid-exposed portion of the
body's surface.

If the body is completely submerged body in an infinitely large volume of irrotational, incompressible, inviscid fluid, that is at rest at infinity, then the vectors  and  can be found via explicit integration, and the dynamics of the body is described by the Kirchhoff – Clebsch equations:

 

 

Their first integrals read

 .

Further integration produces explicit expressions for position and velocities.

References  
 Kirchhoff G. R. Vorlesungen ueber Mathematische Physik, Mechanik. Lecture 19. Leipzig: Teubner. 1877. 
 Lamb, H., Hydrodynamics. Sixth Edition Cambridge (UK): Cambridge University Press. 1932.

Mechanics
Classical mechanics
Rigid bodies
Gustav Kirchhoff